Prapopoulos Bros s.a. is a privately owned company involved in the production and distribution of agricultural, industrial and vineyard equipment based in Patras, Greece.

It is one of the 25 oldest surviving firms in Greece.

Business activities
Prapopoulos Bros s.a. business activities include:

The manufacture and wholesale distribution of:
 Gardening and agricultural spraying machinery.
 Industrial spraying machinery.
 Agricultural dusting machinery
 Tools and professional equipment for home and garden.
 Tanks and containers suitable for the storage of liquid foods.
 Enological equipment covering the home wine-making lifecycle.

History
The company was founded in 1886 by Constantine and George Prapopoulos and in 1929 and became an Anonumous Company (acronym S.A.). The company engaged itself with the manufacture of crop sprayers, pins, nails, cutlery, aluminum utensils, portable gas cookers and other metallic products. Due to the appearance of mildew in the vineyards at the time, sprayers ranked first in the products produced by the company since, as it is known at the time the port of Patras had a significant position in the export of raisins. Soon the company began to grow and in 1893 a new manufacturing plant was built in the centre of Patras. In 1898 the Greek Palace awarded the company the title 'by appointment producers of sprayers to the Greek royal court' of King George 1st. In 1900 the company won the silver medal Groupe VII in Classe 36 at the Exposition Universelle de Paris and in 1900 a Gold and Silver Award for its Agricultural Tools in the 1st Exhibition of Chania in Crete. During the 1920s the company having enough installed capacity was able to sell electrical power to private businesses and the then Electricity Company of Patras. In 1936 the company was awarded the Special Organizers Prize of the 6th Thessaloniki International Fair commemorating 50 years of business.

With the outbreak of the Second World War the factory was bombarded by the Italian Air Force. It remained in operation manufacturing caravans and canteens for the needs of the Greek Army up to the arrival of German troops in Patras in the spring of 1941. After the war the factory continued to operate normally, although with some problems concerning disputes between its shareholders, and in 1977 moved to new premises  in the outskirts of Patras. In 2006 it was awarded the Special Organizers Prize of the 21st Agrotica Exhibition in Thessaloniki, commemorating this time 120 years of business.

The company is currently employed in the manufacture and sale of plant protection equipment (sprayers), garden tools, stainless steel containers for storing liquid foods and wine-making equipment for the amateur winemaker. Many of the construction activities are currently being outsourced but and the company still manufactures in house the traditional line of copper sprayers. It also keeps in house and the final stages of assembly and quality control of its products. In recent years, the company operates outside of Greece, Cyprus, Macedonia and Albania.

Chairmen of the Board of Directors
Constantine P. Prapopoulos (1929–1932)
George P. Prapopoulos (1932–1958)
Marios G. Prapopoulos (1958–1970)
George M. Prapopoulos (1970–1999)
Marios G. Prapopoulos (since 1999)

References

Further reading 
L.S. Skartsis, "Greek Vehicle & Machine Manufacturers 1800 to present: A Pictorial History", Marathon (2012)  (eBook)
See also the Prapopoulos Family (Greek: Οικογένεια Πραπόπουλου) article in the Greek Wikipedia

External links
—
ICAP Greece

Companies based in Patras
Agriculture companies established in the 19th century
Manufacturing companies established in 1886
1886 establishments in Greece
Greek companies established in the 19th century
History of Patras
Greek brands